Padragosiceras is an extinct genus from a well-known class of fossil cephalopods, the ammonites. It lived during the Middle Jurassic.

Distribution
None Cataloged

References

Jurassic ammonites